The Besançon courthouse attack was a terrorist event, targeted the Besançon courthouse on May 9, 1970. 
It was perpetrated with a bomb by two men from OAS and UDR movements, in a context of resurgence of far-right violence in France.

Attack 
On May 9, 1970, at 10:30 pm, the place du Huit-Septembre (September 8 Square) is shaken by an explosion. The Besançon courthouse was just attacked, with a bomb containing explosives and scrap metal. Damage is impressive but limited : only the porch, the bay windows, and the salle des pas perdus (hall of lost steps), partly classifieds, are seriously affected. A couple and their baby narrowly escaped of the impact, but no one injuries are deplored. The mayor, the socialist Jean Minjoz, immediately condemns this act, while the investigation begins. Witnesses say they saw a man throw a device through, before escaping in a car's of an accomplice. At first the attack was attributed to the left, but two individuals were finally arrested in May 14 with the number of their a registration plate. They was former soldiers, workers at the Rhodiaceta factory, one was a member of the OAS and the other a member of the UDR, acting for defiant motives possibly related to power through the SAC. The suspects admit the facts, while weapons and ammunition are found.

References

See also 
 2005 Planoise Forum fire
 Saint-Michel cinema attack

Far-right politics in France
Organisation armée secrète
Gaullism
Building bombings in France
1970 crimes in France
Explosions in 1970
Terrorist incidents in France in 1970
Improvised explosive device bombings in France
May 1970 events in Europe
History of Besançon
Right-wing terrorist incidents